The law of Europe refers to the legal systems of Europe. Europe saw the birth of both the Roman Empire and the British Empire, which form the basis of the two dominant forms of legal system of private law, civil and common law.

History

The law of Europe has a diverse history. Roman law underwent major codification in the Corpus Juris Civilis of Emperor Justinian, as later developed through the Middle Ages by medieval legal scholars. In Medieval England, judges retained greater power than their continental counterparts and began to develop a body of precedent. Originally civil law was one common legal system in much of Europe, but with the rise of nationalism in the 17th century Nordic countries and around the time of the French Revolution, it became fractured into separate national systems. This change was brought about by the development of separate national codes, of which the French Napoleonic Code and the German and Swiss codes were the most influential. Around this time civil law incorporated many ideas associated with the Enlightenment. The European Union's Law is based on a codified set of laws, laid down in the Treaties. Law in the EU is however mixed with precedent in case law of the European Court of Justice. In accordance with its history, the interpretation of European law relies less on policy considerations than U.S. law.

Supranational law
 Council of Europe
 European Union law
 European Convention on Human Rights

Law by countries

 Law of Albania
 Law of Andorra
 Law of Armenia
 Law of Austria
 Law of Azerbaijan
 Law of Belarus
 Law of Belgium
 Law of Bosnia and Herzegovina
 Law of Bulgaria
 Law of Croatia
 Law of Cyprus
 Law of Czech Republic
 Law of Denmark
 Law of Estonia
 Law of Finland
 Law of France
 Law of Georgia
 Law of Germany
 Law of Greece
 Law of Hungary
 Law of Iceland
 Law of Italy
 Law of Kazakhstan
 Law of Latvia
 Law of Liechtenstein
 Law of Lithuania
 Law of Luxembourg
 Law of Republic of Macedonia
 Law of Malta
 Law of Moldova
 Law of Monaco
 Law of Montenegro
 Law of the Netherlands
 Law of Northern Cyprus
 Law of Norway
 Law of Poland
 Law of Portugal
 Law of the Republic of Ireland
 Law of Romania
 Law of Russia
 Law of San Marino
 Law of Serbia
 Law of Slovakia
 Law of Slovenia
 Law of Spain
 Law of Sweden
 Law of Switzerland
 Law of Turkey
 Law of Ukraine
 Law of United Kingdom
 Law of England and Wales
 Law of Northern Ireland
 Law of Scotland
 Law of Vatican City State

Dependencies, autonomies and territories

 Law of Abkhazia
 Law of Åland
 Law of Akrotiri and Dhekelia
 Law of Crimea
 Law of the Faroe Islands
 Law of Gibraltar
 Law of Guernsey
 Law of the Isle of Man
 Law of Jersey
 Law of Nagorno-Karabakh
 Law of Nakhichevan
 Law of Turkish Republic of Northern Cyprus

See also

Legal systems of the world
Legislazione

References

 
Legal systems